Garra tana is a species of tropical ray-finned fish in the genus Garra. It is endemic to Lake Tana in Ethiopia. It reaches a maximum length of around 10.5 cm, and can be found close to shore. It is listed as vulnerable under the IUCN red list status.

References 

Garra
Fish of Lake Tana
Endemic fauna of Ethiopia
Fish described in 2007